Dominique Tilmans (born 1951) is a Belgian politician and a member of the Mouvement Réformateur. She was elected as a member of the Belgian Senate in 2007.

Notes

Living people
Reformist Movement politicians
Members of the Belgian Federal Parliament
1951 births
21st-century Belgian politicians
21st-century Belgian women politicians